"Jealous Again" is the debut single of American band the Black Crowes, released as the lead single from their 1990 debut album, Shake Your Money Maker. The song reached number 75 on the US Billboard Hot 100 and number five on the Billboard Album Rock Tracks charts. It also charted in Australia, Canada, the Netherlands, and the United Kingdom throughout 1990 and 1991.

A music video directed by Pete Angelus was shot to promote the single, and the song was included on the greatest hits compilation Greatest Hits 1990–1999: A Tribute to a Work in Progress. An acoustic rendition of the song is also featured on Croweology, which included nineteen newly recorded versions of the Black Crowes' most popular songs.

Gretchen Wilson lawsuit
On July 30, 2008, the Black Crowes filed a lawsuit against country singer Gretchen Wilson, claiming that she infringed upon their copyright for the song "Jealous Again". The suit also included claims against her label, her publisher, and TNT, who is using the song in promotional commercials. They claim that Wilson copied the Crowes hit when she recorded "Work Hard, Play Harder". The lawsuit was eventually settled out of court for an undisclosed sum and Black Crowes members Chris and Rich Robinson were given songwriting credits on "Work Hard, Play Harder."

Track listings
7-inch and cassette single
A. "Jealous Again" (LP version) – 4:34
B. "Thick N' Thin" (LP version) – 2:43

12-inch and CD single
 "Jealous Again"
 "Waitin' Guilty"
 "Thick N' Thin"

Charts

Release history

References

1990 songs
1990 debut singles
The Black Crowes songs
Songs written by Chris Robinson (singer)
Songs written by Rich Robinson